Elaborative interrogation is a strategy for enhancing memory during the process of learning. In this method, the learner reads the fact-to-be-remembered and generates an explanation for it. The learner uses questions like Why? and How? to understand the meaning of the information. For example, "Why do leaves of a tree fall during winter?" or "How does the falling of leaves occur during winter?" The elaboration technique that is used here aids in clarifying the relationship that exists between the subject (leaves) and the predicate (fall during winter) in the given information. As a result, the clarifying relationship that was seen is basically drawn from the memory. However, the exact prior knowledge that is required for this is not clear. Some researchers emphasize the importance of knowledge on the subject while others give importance towards knowing the abstract details of the information.

Effectiveness
 There is an integration of new facts with the prior knowledge of the learner.
 This method benefits learners across a relatively wide range of age.
 It can be used by students of varying ability levels.
 Learners were able to generate an adequate answer which is better than no answer.

Educational implications
 Students are taught how to generate questions as well as find answers for the given fact/information.
 Students learn to share their thoughts, and justify and defend their derivation of the answer. 
 Students can also form, analyse and clarify their content.

References

Learning methods